The Puritan is the sixth full-length studio album by the Greek/Swedish melodic death metal band, Nightrage. It was released by Despotz on 24 April 2015, format CD/LP/digital. It is their first album with new vocalist Ronnie Nyman.

Track listing

Credits

Band members
Ronnie Nyman − vocals
Marios Iliopoulos − guitars
Anders Hammer – bass
Johan Nunez − drums

Guest musicians
Lawrence Mackrory – additional vocals on "Desperate Vows"
Staffan Winroth – keyboards on "Lone Lake"

References

External links
 

Nightrage albums
2015 albums